The Caucasus Research Resource Centers program (CRRC) is a network for training, research, support and resource centers. It has been established in the capitals of Georgia, Armenia and Azerbaijan, in partnership with the Carnegie Corporation of New York, the Eurasian Partnership Foundation,  USAID and prestigious local universities.  The CRRC’s primary aim is to improve research on social sciences and public policy analysis in the Southern Caucasus region. The program is characterized by the establishment of a network for scholars, researchers, and practitioners, dedicated to strengthening the research capabilities and integration of the various research methods used in academia, as well as fostering engagement with the regional research community. The CRRC’s regional office is devoted to assisting the different country-based centers in establishing effective partnerships among regional scholars,  policy practitioners, social science research professionals,  as well as representatives from governmental and non-governmental sectors. 
In 2004, the CRC began the largest coordinated data collection effort in the South Caucasus region known as the Caucasus Barometer. The Caucasus Barometer is an annually conducted nationwide survey in Georgia, Armenia and Azerbaijan that covers a wide range of, socioeconomic and political issues in the region.  With a sample size of about 6,000 people, the Caucasus Barometer like most of the CRRC’s projects is free and available online to the public on the CRRC’s website.  In addition to the Caucasus Barometer, the CRRC conducts annually over 10 national surveys, focus groups, and other research projects in the Southern Caucasus region.

Fellowship Programs

The CRRC offers two fellowship programs. The Junior Fellowship program was established in 2004 to promote and facilitate first-hand research experience for regional novice researchers within the CRRC team. Fellows also receive rigorous training and contribute to the integration of the South Caucasus region into global academic circles. The Junior Fellowship Program has been in operation in Georgia since 2009, in Azerbaijan since 2011, and in Armenia since 2013. Before 2013, the Armenian office facilitated a long-standing homegrown traditional fellowship program.  

CRRC’s International Fellowship program provides the opportunity for researchers from all over the world  to j,oin CRRC centers in Georgia, Armenia, and Azerbaijan for at least 10 weeks.  During this time, international fellows analyze regional issues addressing key public policy challenges. They are also encouraged to contribute to CRRC’s research and to work on their independent research.

Libraries and computer resources for the public

Each CRRC center has a library and a computer laboratory. These resources provide the public and researchers with a range of information resources such as textbooks, reference materials, and journals. The computer laboratories provide access to online journals and databases related to  social sciences.

External links

CRRC Regional Website
Online Data Analysis
Caucasus Barometer
Monthly E-bulletin
International Fellowship Program
Research Projects
Reports
Resources
Other Publications
CRRC-Armenia
CRRC-Azerbaijan
CRRC-Georgia

References

Caucasus